The Pinnacles,  el. , is a set of mountain peaks within the Big Belt Mountains east of Craig, Montana in Cascade County, Montana.

See also
 List of mountain ranges in Montana

Notes

Mountain ranges of Montana
Landforms of Cascade County, Montana